James Charles McConville (born March 16, 1959) is a United States Army general who serves as the 40th and current chief of staff of the Army. He previously served as the 36th vice chief of staff of the Army from June 16, 2017 to July 26, 2019. Prior to that, he served as the Army's Deputy Chief of Staff for Personnel (G1). He assumed his current assignment on August 9, 2019.

Early life and education
McConville was born and raised in the Merrymount neighborhood of Quincy, Massachusetts, near Boston. He graduated from Archbishop Williams High School in Braintree and then attended the United States Military Academy where he was commissioned as an Infantry officer in the United States Army after his graduation in 1981. He earned a Bachelor of Science degree from the United States Military Academy, a Master of Science degree in Aerospace Engineering from Georgia Institute of Technology, and was a 2002 National Security Fellow at Harvard University.

Military career

McConville's command assignments include commanding general of the 101st Airborne Division (Air Assault), where he also served as the commanding general of the Combined Joint Task Force-101, Operation Enduring Freedom; deputy commanding general for support of the Combined Joint Task Force-101, Operation Enduring Freedom; commander of the 4th Brigade, 1st Cavalry Division, Operation Iraqi Freedom; commander of the 2nd Squadron, 17th Cavalry Regiment, 101st Airborne Division (Air Assault); and commander of C Troop, 2nd Squadron, 9th Cavalry Regiment, 7th Infantry Division (Light).

McConville's key staff assignments include the U.S. Army deputy chief of staff, G-1; chief of legislative liaison; executive officer to the vice chief of staff of the Army; G-3 for 101st Airborne Division (Air Assault); J5 strategic planner for U.S. Special Operations Command; S-3 for 25th Combat Aviation Brigade; S-3 for 5th Squadron, 9th Cavalry; and S-3 for Flight Concepts Division.

McConville is a master army aviator qualified in the OH-58 Kiowa Warrior, the AH-64D Longbow Apache, the AH-6, AH-1 Cobra and other aircraft. He was nominated for appointment to vice chief of Staff on April 24, 2017. On March 25, 2019, McConville was nominated for appointment as chief of staff of the Army. He plans to retire from the Army by the summer of 2023.

Awards and decorations

References

External links

Chief of Staff of the Army official website

|-

1959 births
Living people
People from Quincy, Massachusetts
Military personnel from Massachusetts
United States Military Academy alumni
American Master Army Aviators
Georgia Tech alumni
United States Army generals
Recipients of the Distinguished Service Medal (US Army)
Recipients of the Legion of Merit
United States Army Vice Chiefs of Staff
United States Army Chiefs of Staff